St. David High School is a high school in St. David, Arizona, USA. It is the only high school under the jurisdiction of the St. David Unified School District, which also includes a K-8 school. Together they have some 500 students.

External links
District website

References

Public high schools in Arizona
Schools in Cochise County, Arizona